Athol Hagemann (born 8 October 1937) is a South African cricketer. He played in one List A and thirty first-class matches for Border from 1957/58 to 1969/70.

See also
 List of Border representative cricketers

References

External links
 

1937 births
Living people
South African cricketers
Border cricketers
Cricketers from East London, Eastern Cape